Turicibacter is a genus in the Bacillota phylum of bacteria that has most commonly been found in the guts of animals.
The genus is named after the city in which it was first isolated, Zurich (Latin = Turicum), Switzerland.

Phylogeny
The position of Turicibacter within the Bacillota could not be resolved using 16S rRNA gene-based analyses.  However, it was tentatively placed in the class Bacilli, then the class Erysipelotrichia.

In a tree built using a concatenated protein alignment containing data from two draft Turicibacter genomes, the group was placed at the base of the class Bacilli. Later analyses that also included amino acid sequences predicted by a complete Turicibacter genome came to the same conclusion.

References

Bacteria genera